Theodor Hartig (21 February 1805 – 26 March 1880) was a German forestry biologist and botanist.

Biography
Hartig was born in Dillenburg. He was educated in Berlin (1824–1827), and was successively lecturer and professor of forestry at the University of Berlin (1831–1838) and at the Carolinum, Braunschweig.

Hartig was the first to discover and name the sieve tube element cells (as Siebfasern - sieve fibres and Siebröhren - sieve tubes) in 1837. His zoologist author abbreviation is Hartig. He described many gall wasp species.

In 1842, Theodor Hartig described what is now known as the Hartig net, a network of fungal hyphae that penetrate feeder roots and surround epidermal cells.  The Hartig net is part of the structure of ectomycorrizae, mutualistic symbioses between fungi and plant roots.  

He died in Braunschweig.

Works
1836.  Forstliches und forstnaturwissenschaftliches Conversations-Lexicon. Georg Ludwig Hartig and Theodor Hartig
1840. Über die Familie der Gallwespen. Zeitschrift für die Entomologie, ed. von E.F. Germar, 2: 176–209
1841. Erster Nachtrag zur Naturgeschichte der Gallwespen. Zeitschrift für die Entomologie, ed. von E.F. Germar, 3: 322–358
1843. Zweiter Nachtrag zur Naturgeschichte der Gallwespen. Zeitschrift für die Entomologie, ed. von E.F. Germar, 4: 395–422
1851. Vergleichende Untersuchungen über den Ertrag der Rotbuche (2nd ed.)
1860. Die Aderflügler Deutschlands (2nd ed.)
1866. Forstwissenschaftliches Examinatorium den Waldbau betreffend
1877 Luft-, Boden- und Pflanzenkunde in ihrer Anwendung auf Forstwirtschaft und Gartenbau, bearbeitet von Theodor Hartig für alle Freunde und Pfleger der wissenschaftlicher Botanik
1878. Anatomie und physiologie der holzpflanzen. Dargestellt in der entstehungsweise und im entwickelungsverlaufe der einzelzelle, der zellsysteme, der pflanzenglieder und der gesammtpflanze

In collaboration with his father, Georg Ludwig Hartig, he published the work entitled, Forstliches und naturwissenschaftliches Konversationslexikon. The eleventh edition of his father's Lehrbuch für Förster, the later reprints of which he had revised, was published in 1877.

Family
He was the son of Georg Ludwig Hartig (1764–1837), a German forester. His son Robert (1839–1901) was a forest scientist and mycologist who is considered the "father of forest pathology".

References

1805 births
1880 deaths
Academic staff of the Technical University of Braunschweig
19th-century German botanists
German entomologists
German foresters
Humboldt University of Berlin alumni
Academic staff of the Humboldt University of Berlin